Die Völkerfreiheit ('Peoples' Freedom') was a German language newspaper published from Kiev between May 31, 1919 and August 1919. Die Völkerfreiheit was a continuation of Weltkommune ('World Commune'), a German-language communist publication which had been founded in Kharkov in late 1918.

It was the organ of the German Group of the Ukrainian Communist Party (Spartakus Group) in Kiev. The editorial office of Die Völkerfreiheit was located on 23, Lyuteranska Street. Copies of the newspaper were sold for 60 kopeks.

Copies of Die Völkerfreiheit were distributed among prisoners of war.

References

German-language communist newspapers
Mass media in Kyiv
Newspapers established in 1919
Publications disestablished in 1919